Maki Engineering was a Formula One constructor from Japan.  A small team founded by Kenji Mimura, their entry into the 1974 Formula One World Championship was Japan's first since Honda had withdrawn at the end of the 1968 season. They first entered the 1974 British Grand Prix, with New Zealand driver Howden Ganley driving a single Maki F101, powered by the ubiquitous Cosworth DFV V8 engine. He failed to qualify, and then badly injured his legs at the following German Grand Prix. The team then withdrew to Japan to repair and modify the car.

That seemed to be it, but then the small team re-emerged at the 1975 Dutch Grand Prix, with successful domestic driver Hiroshi Fushida driving the updated Maki F101C, and sponsorship from Citizen Watches. With only 25 entrants, he was guaranteed a starting place, but the DFV broke in practice and he was unable to start as the team had no spares. They missed the French Grand Prix, and then Fushida failed to qualify for the British Grand Prix. For the German Grand Prix, former Lotus F1 driver Tony Trimmer replaced Fushida, but was unable to qualify either there, or for the Austrian Grand Prix. Maki made its first and only race start in the non-championship Swiss Grand Prix, where Trimmer finished last of the finishers in 13th place, six laps behind Clay Regazzoni's Ferrari.

The team disappeared once again, only returning to Formula One once – for the 1976 season-closing Japanese Grand Prix. With Trimmer in the seat, the upgraded F102A once again failed to make the grid, and the team were never seen in Formula One again.

Complete Formula One results

Formula One World Championship
(key)

Non-championship results

References 
Maki profile at Grandprix.com Encyclopedia
Maki Formula One Results
Profile on F1 Rejects

Formula One constructors
Formula One entrants
Japanese auto racing teams
Japanese racecar constructors